Minnie Sue Coleman (October 11, 1926 – January 3, 2012) was an American artist. She was one of the Gee's Bend quilt-makers, along with her mother, Minder Coleman. In 2006 her quilt "Pig in a Pen" medallion appeared on a US Postal service stamp as part of a series commemorating Gee's bend quilters.

References 

Quilters
1926 births
2012 deaths
African-American women artists
Artists from Alabama
20th-century American women artists
20th-century African-American women
20th-century African-American people
20th-century African-American artists
21st-century African-American people
21st-century African-American women